Japan–Philippines relations span a period from before the 16th century to the present. According to a 2011 BBC World Service Poll, 84% of Filipinos view Japan's influence positively, with 12% expressing a negative view, making the Philippines one of the most pro-Japanese countries in the world.

Early Japan-Philippines Interactions

Relations between Japan and the kingdoms in the Philippines date back to at least the pre-colonial period of Filipino history or the Muromachi period of Japanese history. Austronesian speakers presumably from the Philippines and Taiwan, known as the Hayato and Kumaso, were immigrants to Japan and even served in the Imperial Court. Mishima ware imported from Luzon-Philippines were also traded in Japan; these were especially sourced from the Filipino kingdoms of Tondo, Manila, and Pangasinan at Luzon island, as these traded with Japan. Likewise, the natives of the Philippines helped shelter Japanese merchants and traders in northern Luzon in 1440, while 20 Japanese traders were also recorded in Manila by 1517. In 1580, while Filipino natives were helping Japanese sailors, a Japanese pirate named Tayfusa colonized parts of Cagayan in northern Luzon, establishing his own kingdom. In 1582, the Spanish arrived in Cagayan to colonize it for themselves. This led to the 1582 Cagayan battles, which resulted to the expulsion of Tayfusa's forces.

Around 1600, an the area of Dilao, a district of Manila, was a Nihonmachi of around 3,000 Japanese or Filipinos with Japanese descent. The term probably originated from the Tagalog term 'dilaw', meaning 'yellow', which describes their general physiognomy. The Japanese had established quite early an enclave at Dilao where they numbered between 300 and 400 in 1593. In 1603, during the Sangley rebellion, they numbered 1,500, and 3,000 in 1606. In the 16th and 17th centuries, thousands of Japanese people traders also migrated to the Philippines and assimilated into the local population. pp. 52–3

In 1593, Spanish authorities in Manila authorized the dispatch of Franciscan missionaries to Japan. The Franciscan friar Luis Sotelo was involved in the support of the Dilao enclave between 1600 and 1608.

In the first half of the 17th century, intense official trade took place between the two countries, through the Red seal ships system. Thirty official "Red seal ship" passports were issued between Japan and the Philippines between 1604 and 1616.

The Japanese led an abortive rebellion in Dilao against the Spanish Empire in 1606–1607, but their numbers rose again until the interdiction of Christianity by Tokugawa Ieyasu in 1614, when 300 Japanese Christian refugees under Takayama Ukon settled in the Philippines. On 8 November 1614, together with 300 Japanese Christians Takayama Ukon left his home country from Nagasaki. He arrived at Manila on 21 December and was greeted warmly by the Spanish Jesuits and the local Filipinos there. The Spanish Philippines offered its assistance in overthrowing the Japanese government by invasion to protect Japanese Catholics. Justo declined to participate and died of illness just 40 days afterward. These 17th-century immigrants are at the origin of some of today's 200,000-strong Japanese population in the Philippines.

More rebellions such as one known as the Tondo conspiracy by Filipinos against Spain, had Japanese merchants and Christians involved, but the conspiracy was disbanded. Toyotomi Hideyoshi threatened the Spanish to leave or face full scale Japanese invasion, however, this was near his decline and death. The Tokugawa Shogunate rose in power right after.

In the 17th century (1633 & 1635), Japan established an isolationist (sakoku) policy, and contacts between the two nations were severed until after the opening of Japan in 1854. In the 16th and 17th centuries, thousands of Japanese traders also migrated to the Philippines and assimilated into the local population. In 1888, Filipino national hero Jose Rizal arrived in Japan and had a relationship with Seiko Usui (Osei-san), a daughter of a samurai.

Philippines and the Empire of Japan

In 1875, Emperor Mutsuhito Meiji sent an economic mission to resume normal trade between the Empire of Japan and the Philippines. Then, thirteen years after, he ordered to establish a Japanese consulate that would be based in Manila, and Umekichi Yatabe, was the first Japanese consul.

According to the Spanish diplomat F.E. Reynoso, in 1894 the Japanese offered to buy the Philippines from Spain for 40 million pounds sterling. However, according to Reynoso this offer was not accepted. According to the scholar C.E. Russell, in 1896 Spain was rumoured to have offered to sell the islands to Japan for $3,000,000 gold dollars, but this offer was rejected.

During the 1896 revolution against Spanish colonial rule, some Filipino insurgents (especially the Katipunan) sought assistance from the Japanese government. The Katipunan sought to send a delegate to the Emperor of Japan to solicit funds and military arms in May 1896. The beginning of the uprising coincided with a visit to Manila by the Japanese warship Kongō, and the leadership approached the captain of the ship in an attempt to buy arms from Japan, but no deal was made. Nevertheless, despite no official support from the Japanese government, there were still individual Japanese citizens who joined in the Philippine Revolution against Spain and the Philippine-American War.

The Meiji government of Japan was unwilling and unable to provide any official support. However, Japanese supporters of Philippine independence in the Pan-Asian movement raised funds and sent weapons on the privately charted Nunobiki Maru, which sank before reaching its destination. However, the Japanese government officially acquiesced to American colonial rule over the Philippines, as ratified by the Taft–Katsura Agreement of 1905. 
During the American period, Japanese economic ties to the Philippines expanded tremendously and by 1929 Japan was the largest trading partner to the Philippines after the United States. Economic investment was accompanied by large-scale immigration of Japanese to the Philippines, mainly merchants, gardeners and prostitutes ('karayuki-san'). Davao that time had over 20,000 ethnic Japanese residents. In Baguio, Japanese workers represented about 22% of the workforce that constructed Benguet Road (later renamed Kennon Road), so that Baguio later had a significant Japanese population. By 1935, it was estimated that Japanese immigrants dominated 35% of Philippine retail trade. Investments included extensive agricultural holdings and natural resource development. By 1940, some 40% of Philippine exports to Japan were iron, copper, manganese and chrome.

When it comes to the Philippine importation of electrical machineries and appliances, Japan was tied with China for the 2nd-largest supplier of such products, and of course, the United States dominated the trade influx of such items. 

As the Commonwealth period came, the Japanese Ministry of Foreign Affairs along with their representatives in the Philippines assessed that since the main purpose of the Commonwealth inaugurated was to establish a transition period towards their independence from the Americans, Japan thought that the majority of the Filipinos would already not turn to them, asking for assistance or aid to attain independence. Even more, the scent of conspicuousness is at its peak due to their economic presence in the country would be detrimental in establishing sincerity and friendship with the Filipinos since they are becoming more wary. 

During World War II, immediately after the attack on Pearl Harbor, Japanese forces invaded and quickly overcame resistance by the United States and Philippine Commonwealth military. Strategically, Japan needed the Philippines to prevent its use by Allied forces as a forward base of operations against the Japanese home islands, and against its plans for the further conquest of Southeast Asia. In 1943, a puppet government, the Second Philippine Republic, was established, but gained little popular support, primarily due to the Imperial Japanese Army's brutal conduct towards the Philippine civilian population. During the course of the Japanese occupation, and subsequent battles during the American and Filipino re-invasion, an estimated one million Filipinos died, giving rise to lingering anti-Japanese sentiment. More than a thousand Filipino "comfort women", composed of mothers, girls, and gay men, were forcibly taken by Japan to serve at their sex slave camps during the occupation.

Hundreds of heritage cities and towns throughout the country lay in ruins due to intentional fire and kamikaze tactics imposed by the Japanese and bombings imposed by the Americans. Only a single heritage town, Vigan, survived. The government of the Empire of Japan never gave any compensation for the restoration of Filipino heritage towns and cities, while the United States only gave minimal funding for two cities, Manila and Baguio. A decade after the war, the heritage landscape of the Philippines was never restored due to a devastated economy, lack of funding, and lack of cultural experts during the time. The heritage zones were effectively replaced by old shanty houses and cement houses with cheap plywood or galvanized iron as roofs. According to a United States analysis released years after the war, U.S. casualties were 10,380 dead and 36,550 wounded; Japanese dead were 255,795. Filipino deaths, on the other hand, have not been officially tallied but was estimated to be more than one million, an astounding percentage of the national population at the time. The Philippine population decreased continuously for the next 5 years due to the spread of diseases and the lack of basic needs, far from Filipino lifestyle prior to the war where the country used to be the second richest in Asia, ironically, next only to Japan.

Post-war relations

The Philippines was granted independence in 1946, and was a signatory to the 1951 San Francisco Peace Treaty with Japan. The two countries had a long, protracted process about postwar reparations before formalizing diplomatic relations. As detailed in the Japanese Instrument of Surrender, the authority of the Japanese Emperor and Japanese government was subjected to Supreme Commander for the Allied Powers (SCAP) Douglas MacArthur. The Far Eastern Commission (FEC) was also formed. It was a body composed of Allied members tasked with formulating the policies of occupied Japan which would be enforced by the SCAP. Carlos P. Romulo represented the Philippines in this body.

Japan entered into negotiations with several countries for postwar reparations. The US policy was to have Japan pay for reparations in the form of goods or existing capital equipment and facilities. According to the US Department of State, this was to ensure Japan could continue its demilitarization process, as these were not necessary neither for the occupation forces nor for a peaceful Japanese economy. The United States sought to form the Inter-Allied Reparations Committee which would focus on policies for reparations. However, as this involved the contested territories of Manchuria, Sakhalin and the Kuril Islands, the then-Soviet Union opted to veto. In 1947, the US again pushed this agenda with the Advance Reparations Transfer Program, which would focus on  early reparations for four countries, chosen for their stance against Imperial Japan and their assistance to the United States. These were, namely: the Philippines, China, Holland (representing Indonesia) and Great Britain (representing Burma and Malaysia).

The discussion of reparations took an abrupt turn due to the intensifying spread of communism in Greece and Turkey during the Cold War. This prompted the move of the United States to pursue the Containment Policy, aimed at stopping the spread of communism worldwide. One of the advocates of the Containment Policy, George F. Kennan, suggested the immediate rehabilitation of Japan's industrial and military capacity in order to best assist the US in countering communism in Asia. This ran counter to the initial position of the United States in regards to reparations, but after Mao Zedong took control of China and the onset of the Korean War, Japan was directly exposed to the threat.

The United States sent survey missions to Japan to assess the industrial capacity of the country and agreed with Kennan's suggestion. The United States ended the Advance Reparations Transfer Program, to which the Philippines, through Romulo and Foreign Affairs Undersecretary Felino Neri, objected. Countries involved also started working towards a peace treaty. Romulo and Neri put forth the Philippine position that they recognize the threat of Communism, as the country itself faces an insurgency of their own, and that they also welcome the Peace Treaty to ensure Japan can actively participate in negotiations. However, they reiterated their concern for reparations. When the 1951 San Francisco Peace Treaty was signed, Romulo lamented that it "fails to provide for reparations in the form and manner [they] desire." However, he conceded that it was still a step in the right direction as it would be even more detrimental for the Philippines not to sign it. Furthermore, he expressed optimism as Japanese Premier Shigeru Yoshida "solemnly pledged to [them] that Japan will do all that is humanly possible to repair the damage it has done to the Philippines."

In 1954, the Japanese government started to beguile or invite Filipinos to take-up their studies in their country, through the formation of scholarships that was managed by the Ministry of Education of Japan. Theoretically speaking, the students who would be availing of this invitation should be amongst the ones who would help the Philippines to recover or another angle, contribute to the economic development of the country. Only later in 1985 did the Japanese Ministry gave scholarships for those who wanted to pursue a course in a technical college, then three years later, for those who intend to pursue a vocational course.

Diplomatic relations were normalized and re-established in 1956, when the war reparations agreement was finally concluded. By the end of the 1950s, Japanese companies and individual investors had begun to return to the Philippines. Japan and the Philippines signed a Treaty of Amity, Commerce and Navigation in 1960, but the treaty did not go into effect until 1973.

Relations during the Marcos Administration 
Hirohito met with President Ferdinand Marcos in a state visit by the latter to Japan in 1966 - a year after Marcos' election and about six years before Marcos declared martial law.

In 1972, Marcos abolished the Philippine legislature under martial law, and took on its legislative powers as part of his authoritarian rule. He ratified the Treaty of Amity, Commerce and Navigation ten days prior to a visit of Japanese Prime Minister Kakuei Tanaka.

By 1975, Japan had displaced the United States as the main source of investment in the country.  Marcos administration projects put up during this time include the Philippines-Japan Friendship Highway which included the construction of the San Juanico Bridge, and the Research Institute for Tropical Medicine.  However, many of these projects were later criticized for helping prop up the corrupt practices of the Marcos administration, resulting in what became called the Marukosu giwaku (マルコス疑惑), or "Marcos scandal", of 1986.

Japan ODA scandal 

When the Marcoses were exiled to Hawaii in the United States in February 1986 after the People Power Revolution, the American authorities confiscated papers that they brought with them. The confiscated documents revealed that since the 1970s, Marcos and his associates received commissions of 10 to 15 percent of Overseas Economic Cooperation Fund loans from about fifty Japanese contractors.

The Japanese government discreetly requested the Philippine government to downplay the issue as it would affect the business sector and bilateral relations.

The lessons from the Marcos scandals were among the reasons why Japan created its 1992 ODA Charter.

After 1986 

Japan remained a major source of development funds, trade, investment, and tourism in the 1980s, and there have been few foreign policy disputes between the two nations.

When Philippine President Corazon Aquino's administration was installed as a result of the People Power Revolution, Japan was one of the first countries to express support for the new Philippine government.

Philippine President Corazon Aquino visited Japan in November 1986 and met with Emperor Hirohito, who offered his apologies for the wrongs committed by Japan during World War II. New foreign aid agreements also were concluded during this visit. Aquino returned to Japan in 1989 for Hirohito's funeral and in 1990 for the enthronement of Emperor Akihito.

Regarding the voting of the Philippine Senate to extend a treaty allowing the stay of U.S. bases in the Philippines, Japan was in favor for the extension of the defense treaty. In fact, some of its officials including Ambassador Toshio Goto, Foreign Minister Taro Nakayama and Prime Minister Toshiki Kaifu expressed public disagreement on a negative vote on the extension. However the Philippine Senate rejected the extension of the defense treaty despite extensive lobbying for its extension by the first Aquino administration, even calling for a referendum regarding the matter.
In 1998, 246,000 Filipinos lived in Japan.

Upon the withdrawal of most American troops in the Philippines, relations between the United States and the Philippines remained strong as assured by US President Bill Clinton to Philippine President Fidel V. Ramos during the latter's visit to Washington on 21 November 1993. Likewise the Philippines-Japan relations were strengthened with Japan filling the gap the United States left. Even before Ramos became president he held talks with the Japan Ministry of Defense to improve defense relations as Defense Secretary under Corazon Aquino's administration.

During a meeting with President Ramos in 1993, Japanese Prime Minister Kiichi Miyazawa reiterated his apology for his country's war crimes committed against the Philippines and its people during World War II and would consider the best way to address the issue. The Ramos administration also supported Japan's bid to become a permanent member of the United Nations Security Council, together with Germany.

Japan also became the top donor of aid to the Philippines, followed by the United States and Germany. Japan also contributed the largest amount of international aid to the Philippines after the latter suffered from the 1990 Luzon earthquake and 1991 Mount Pinatubo eruption. In 2009, Japan supported an NGO which repatriated the skeletons of Japanese soldiers from World War II. The NGO repatriated numerous skeletons of indigenous Filipino ancestors, along with few Japanese skeletons, causing rallies in the Philippines. Japan ended its support for the skeleton repatriation program afterwards, however, the remains of the indigenous Filipinos were never sent back to the ancestral communities they were stolen from.

Strategic relationship between the two countries has been strong recently. Japan supports the resolution of the Islamic insurgency in the Philippines.
In 2013, Japan announced it would donate ten ships valued at US$11 million to the Philippine Coast Guard. Japan and the Philippines share a "mutual concern" on China's increasing assertiveness in its territorial claims.

In November 2015, the Philippine government and the Japan International Cooperation Agency (JICA) signed a $2-billion loan agreement for the JICA to fund part of the construction of a railway system between the Tutuban railway station in Manila to Malolos, Bulacan in the Philippines, which is targeted to become the country's largest railway system. According to the Philippine Department of Finance, the agreement was the JICA's "largest assistance ever extended to any country for a single project."

On 29 February 2016, Japan Signed a pact to supply defense equipment to Philippines.  The agreement provides a framework for the supply of defense equipment and technology and will allow the two countries to carry out joint research and development projects. On 3 April 2016, Japanese training submarine JS Oyashio, along with two destroyers JS Ariake and JS Setogiri docked at the Alava Pier in Subic Bay for a three-day goodwill visit. In early May 2016, plans to spearhead a Japan-Philippine Mutual Defense Treaty was one of the key defense plans of the government if Mar Roxas wins the presidency. However, the 10 May presidential elections resulted to the presidential victory of Rodrigo Duterte. In October, 2016, talks about the defense treaty was revived when the government stated that the possible treaty 'may' be discussed by Duterte and Abe during Duterte's first official visit to Japan. The visit however resulted in no talks regarding the possible treaty after Duterte decided to ally himself with China.

In 2017, civilian groups in the Philippines and other countries joined forces to push for the inscription of Voices of the ”Comfort Women” in the UNESCO Memory of the World Programme. The inscription, however, was blocked by Japan. On the same year, a blindfolded Filipina comfort women statue was erected in Manila, the capital of the Philippines, by surviving Filipino comfort women and their supporters. By April 2018, the comfort woman statue was removed from the capital after Duterte met with Japanese diplomats. The statue was scheduled to be reinstalled at front of Baclaran Church, but was allegedly stolen.

Japanese Official Development Assistance (ODA) to the Philippines
Japan has been the Philippines' biggest source of bilateral Official Development Assistance since 2001, with its ODA loans to the Philippines accounting for 72 percent of the Philippines’ total bilateral loan portfolio as of 2021.

Japan disburses Official Development Assistance to the Philippines through the Japan International Cooperation Agency (JICA) when the ODA is in the form of projects, and directly through the Embassy of Japan to the Philippines in the case of non-project grant aid.

See also

Japanese in the Philippines
Japanese occupation of the Philippines
Filipinos in Japan
Dom Justo Takayama (Takayama Ukon)
Domingo Siazon
Marcos scandals
Taft–Katsura Agreement
Diwata (satellite)

References

Further reading
 Ikehata, Setsuho and Lydia Yu-Jose,  eds. Philippines-Japan Relations ( Ateneo De Manila University Press, 2003) . 
 Tana, Maria Thaemar, and Yusuke Takagi. "Japan's foreign relations with the Philippines: A case of evolving Japan in Asia." in James D.J. Brown and Jeff Kingston, eds. Japan's Foreign Relations in Asia (Routledge, 2018) pp. 312–328.
 Trinidad, Dennis D. "Domestic Factors and Strategic Partnership: Redefining Philippines‐Japan Relations in the 21st Century." Asian Politics & Policy 9.4 (2017): 613-635. online
 Trinidad, Dennis D. "Towards strategic partnership: Philippines–Japan relations after seventy years." in Mark R. Thompson, Eric Vincent C. Batalla, eds. Routledge Handbook of the Contemporary Philippines ( Routledge, 2018) pp. 186–196.
 Yu-Jose, Lydia N. "World War II and the Japanese in the prewar Philippines." Journal of Southeast Asian Studies 27#1  (1996): 64–81. Online

External links
 Embassy of Japan in the Philippines
 Embassy of the Philippines in Japan
 Japan Ministry of Foreign Affairs

 
Philippines
Bilateral relations of the Philippines
Relations of colonizer and former colony